Zophomyia is a genus of flies in the family Tachinidae.

Species
Species within this genus include:
Zophomyia albicalyptrata
Zophomyia clausa
Zophomyia flavipalpis
Zophomyia flavipennis
Zophomyia gymnophthalma
Zophomyia nitens
Zophomyia temula
Zophomyia tibialis
Zophomyia varipalpis
Zophomyia vicina

References

Tachininae
Diptera of Europe
Tachinidae genera
Taxa named by Pierre-Justin-Marie Macquart